This is a list of the Croatia national under-21 football team results from 2000 to 2009.

After qualifying for its debut at the 2000 Euro, Croatia was eliminated in the group stage. The team then missed the next 2002 Euro, but it went on to qualify for the 2004 Euro, being eliminated in the group stage for the second time. It failed to qualify for subsequent Euros of the decade.

In 2008, Croatia participated in the minor Inter Continental Cup in Malaysia against U23 teams, finishing the tournament in the group stage.

Key 

Match outcomes

As per statistical convention in football, matches decided in extra time are counted as wins and losses, while matches decided by penalty shoot-outs are counted as draws.

By year

2000

2001

2002

2003

2004

2005

2006

2007

2008

2009

Record per opponent 

2000s in Croatia
Croatia national under-21 football team